Finn Reynolds (born 4 January 2000) is a tennis player from New Zealand.

Reynolds first represented New Zealand at the Davis Cup in 2021, where he lost his debut match to World number 83 Kwon Soon-woo.

Reynolds plays college tennis at Ole Miss.

ITF Circuit finals

Doubles: 5 (4 titles, 1 runner-up)

Davis Cup (1)

   indicates the outcome of the Davis Cup match followed by the score, date, place of event, the zonal classification and its phase, and the court surface.

References

External links

2000 births
Living people
New Zealand male tennis players
Ole Miss Rebels men's tennis players
Sportspeople from Hastings, New Zealand